The Mecklenburg Southern Railway or Parchim–Neubrandenburg railway is a railway line in the south of Mecklenburg-Vorpommern in North Germany. It was operated by the Mecklenburg Southern Railway Company which transferred in 1885 into the Friedrich Franz Railway Company. Today the section from Möllenhagen to Neubrandenburg is closed, whilst the remaining section is owned by the DB Netz. The section from Karow (Meckl) to Waren (Müritz) was leased by the DB to the Prignitzer Eisenbahn on 1 March 2008. Passenger services on the (Ludwigslust–)Parchim–Waren(–Neustrelitz) stretch are provided by the Ostdeutsche Eisenbahn (ODEG) and goods services on the sections from Waren to Malchow (Meck.) and Möllenhagen are delivered mainly by DB Schenker Rail Deutschland.

References

External links 

 Route description at ralfs-eisenbahn.de 
 Documentation about the Mecklenburg Southern Railway 

Railway lines in Mecklenburg-Western Pomerania
Defunct railway companies of Germany
Neubrandenburg
Buildings and structures in Mecklenburgische Seenplatte (district)